The 2016 Liberty Bowl was a post-season American college football bowl game played on January 2, 2016, at Liberty Bowl Memorial Stadium in Memphis, Tennessee. The 57th edition of the Liberty Bowl featured the Kansas State Wildcats of the Big 12 Conference against the Arkansas Razorbacks of the Southeastern Conference.  It began at 2:20 p.m. CST and aired on ESPN.  It was one of the 2015–16 bowl games that concluded the 2015 FBS football season.  Sponsored by automobile parts and accessories store AutoZone, it was officially known as the AutoZone Liberty Bowl.

Teams
The game featured the Kansas State Wildcats against the Arkansas Razorbacks.

Kansas State Wildcats

After finishing their season 6–6, the Wildcats accepted their invitation to play in the game.

This was the Wildcats' first Liberty Bowl.

Arkansas Razorbacks

After finishing their season 7–5, the Razorbacks accepted their invitation to play in the game.

This was the Razorbacks' fifth Liberty Bowl, giving them the new record for most appearances in the game. The Razorbacks are now 2–3 all-time in the Liberty Bowl, losing the 1971 Liberty Bowl to Tennessee 14–13, then losing the 1984 Liberty Bowl to Auburn 21–15, losing the 1987 Liberty Bowl to Georgia 20–17, and finally winning the 2010 Liberty Bowl over East Carolina 20–17 in overtime.

Game summary

Scoring summary

Source:

Statistics

Arkansas running back Alex Collins was named the game's MVP, after gaining 185 yards and 3 touchdowns on 23 carries.

References

2015–16 NCAA football bowl games
2016,01
2016
2016
2016 in sports in Tennessee
January 2016 sports events in the United States